Chorten Kora is an important stupa next to the Kholongchu River in Trashi Yangtse, in East Bhutan. Nearby is a town of the same name. The stupa was built in the 15th century  by Lama Ngawang Lodrö, the nephew of Shabdrung Ngawang Namgyal in order to subdue a harmful demon believed to have been living at the site where the stupa is now located. The stupa is modeled after the famous Boudhanath stupa in Nepal popularly known as Jarung Khashor. 

Chorten Kora took twelve years to construct and was consecrated by Je Yonten Thaye. The demon that had harmed the people of the valley was apparently subdued and banished. Thereafter, it is said that the people of the valley continue to live in peace and harmony.

Chorten Kora Festivals
There is an annual Dakpa Kora (circumambulation of the Chorten by the Dakpas) festival held on the 15th of the first lunar month, and a Drukpa Kora (circumambulation of the Chorten by the Bhutanese) festival held at the end of the first lunar month which celebrate the stupa. These festivals are attended by Dakpa people of the neighboring Tawang District of Arunachal Pradesh in India, and Bhutanese from Trashi Yangtse, Trashigang, and Kurtoe.   

A popular belief is that when the stupa was constructed, a pious Dakini princess from neighboring Arunachal Pradesh in India entombed herself within, as the Yeshe Semba, to meditate on behalf of all beings. A popular Bhutanese (Dzongkha language) film "Chorten Kora" is based on this legend.

See also
Chendebji Chorten, another Nepalese style chorten in Bhutan

References
Lam Kezang Chhophel. 'A Brief History of Rigsum Goenpo Lhakhang and Choeten Kora at Trashi Yangtse.'
Journal of Bhutan Studies vol.6, pp. 1–4. http://himalaya.socanth.cam.ac.uk/collections/journals/jbs/pdf/JBS_06_01.pdf

External links
 Photo of Chorten Kora at the Huntington Archive

Stupas in Bhutan